evoJets is a private aviation company specializing in private jet charter and aircraft sales & acquisitions.  Founded in Aspen, CO in 2006, the company is now headquartered in New York City.  evoJets primarily offers on-demand jet charter services across USA and other international destinations. It is a registered member of the Better Business Bureau in New York and Colorado, but provides charter services in the US and internationally.

History 
evoJets was founded in Aspen, CO by Chris Kelly and Adriann Wanner, two entrepreneurs with a personal tie to the private jet industry.  The company began with an angel investment and an initial client list of friends, relatives and members of the affluent Aspen community.  In its initial years, the company operated primarily to serve these clients and their subsequent referrals.

References

Aircraft leasing companies
Transportation companies based in New York City